Sir John Stanley, 1st Baronet (1663 – 30 November 1744) of Grangegorman, Co. Dublin was an Irish politician.

Biography
Stanley was born in Tickencor, County Waterford, the son of Sir Thomas Stanley of Grangegorman, Dublin and his wife, Jane Borrowes and educated at Trinity College, Dublin.

Stanley was Secretary to various Lords Chamberlains of the Household (1689–1699), Commissioner of Stamp Duties (1698-1700), the Chief Secretary for Ireland 1713–1714, Teller of the Receipt of the Exchequer and MP for Gorey 1713. He was elected a Fellow of the Royal Society in 1688. From 1700 until 1708 he served as Warden of the Mint under Isaac Newton.

Stanley was made Baronet Stanley in 1699. The baronetage became extinct on his death on 30 November 1744.

Marriage

He married Ann Granville (d.1730), a daughter of Bernard Granville (1631-1701) of Birdcage Walk, Westminster, and Apps Court, Walton-on-Thames, Surrey, a courtier, Gentleman of the Horse and Groom of the Bedchamber to King Charles II, and a Member of Parliament for several Cornish constituencies, and younger brother of John Granville, 1st Earl of Bath, who played an important role in effecting the Restoration of the Monarchy. They had no children. Mary Delany was the niece of Ann Granville and lived with them at Whitehall from the ages of 8 to 15.

Notes

References

1663 births
1744 deaths
Chief Secretaries for Ireland
Baronets in the Baronetage of England
Irish MPs 1713–1714
Fellows of the Royal Society
Members of the Privy Council of Ireland
Members of the Parliament of Ireland (pre-1801) for County Wexford constituencies